Section 31 may refer to:

 Section 31 (Star Trek), a fictional organization
 Star Trek: Section 31, a novel series about the organization 
 Star Trek: Section 31 (TV series), an upcoming television series
 Section 31 of the Constitution of Australia
 Section 31 of the Canadian Charter of Rights and Freedoms
 Section 31 of the Broadcasting Act of Ireland
 Section 31 or Section 31 Project, initial name for the Storyliving by Disney Cotino community

See also

 31 (disambiguation)